The 2000 season was Molde's 25th season in the top flight of Norwegian football. This season Molde competed in Tippeligaen, the Norwegian Cup and the UEFA Cup. 

In Tippeligaen, Molde finished in 7th position, 14 points behind winners Rosenborg, but only five points behind third placed Viking. 

Molde participated in the 2000 Norwegian Cup. They defeated Tornado Måløy and Brann, both away from home, on their way to the quarterfinal. On 6 September 2000, Molde initially won the quarterfinal 4-3 at away ground against Start. However, Start went through to the semifinal after protesting Molde's use of ineligible player Martin Andresen, who was not listed at the referee's card.

In the UEFA Cup, Molde was drawn against Spanish team Rayo Vallecano in the 1st round. Molde lost the first leg at home at Molde Stadion with the score 0–1. Petter Rudi missed a penalty in the 58th minute. The second leg in Spain ended in a 1–1 draw which resulted in a 1–2 loss on aggregate and elimination from the 2000–01 UEFA Cup.

Squad

As of end of season.

Competitions

Tippeligaen

Results summary

Results by round

Results

League table

Norwegian Cup

Because of competing of the national team at the UEFA Euro 2000, the 14 teams from Tippeligaen received a bye to the third round.

UEFA Cup

First round

Squad statistics

Appearances and goals

             
                                 

        

|-
|colspan="14"|Players away from Molde on loan:
|-
|colspan="14"|Players who left Molde during the season:
 

|}

Goal Scorers

See also
Molde FK seasons

References

External links
nifs.no

2000
Molde